Dormant Heart is the fourth full-length album released by British heavy metal band Sylosis. It was released on 12 January 2015 in United Kingdom, 13 January 2015 in North America, and 16 January 2015 in Europe. It is the last album to feature drummer Rob Callard and bassist Carl Parnell.

Track listing

Personnel
Sylosis

 Josh Middleton – lead guitar, lead vocals
 Alex Bailey – rhythm guitar
 Carl Parnell – bass
 Rob Callard – drums

Production and design
 Scott Atkins – engineering, mixing
 Josh Middleton – producer, art concept
 Acle Kahney – mastering
 Bonfire – artwork

Trivia
Due to time restraints, Rob Callard departed Sylosis before the release of Dormant Heart, and was replaced by Bleed from Within drummer Ali Richardson, who did not contribute to the recording of the album.

References

External links
 Official website

2015 albums
Sylosis albums
Nuclear Blast albums